Jar-Korgon is a village in Nookat District of Osh Region of Kyrgyzstan. Its population was 4,336 in 2021.

References

Populated places in Osh Region